Trawsfynydd railway station served the village of Trawsfynydd, Gwynedd, Wales.

Origins
At Festiniog passengers had to transfer to narrow gauge trains if they wished to continue northwards.

The following year the narrow gauge line was converted to standard gauge, but narrow gauge trains continued to run until 5 September 1883 using a 3-rail dual gauge track. Standard gauge trains first ran through from Bala and Trawsfynydd to Blaenau Ffestiniog on 10 September 1883.

Station facilities
Trawsfynydd was the largest intermediate settlement and station on the route. Trawsfynydd shed - a sub-shed of Croes Newydd - was proposed for closure in 1955, but was reprieved due to the strength of local opposition, whose key argument was that having such a shed enabled the railway to take action to prevent blockages in the event of sudden or prolonged snow - a noted feature of the upper reaches of the line.

The station buildings at Trawsfynydd were on the Down (northbound) side and provided a ticket office, waiting room, a lavatory and a urinal as well as rooms for staff use and a substantial signalbox on the platform. The Up platform had a waiting room. A goods shed backed onto the engine shed. The site was dominated by a very large water tank on top of the embankment on the Up side. Both platforms carried a water crane.

The route was single track throughout. The stations at Bala, Arenig, Trawsfynydd and Festiniog had two platforms, each with its own track. This both allowed for potential traffic and provided passing loops.

Services
The September 1959 timetable shows
 Northbound
 three trains calling at all stations from Bala to Blaenau on Monday to Saturday
 an extra evening train calling at all stations from Bala to Blaenau on Saturday
 a Monday to Friday train calling at all stations from Bala to Trawsfynydd
 The journey time from Bala to Trawsfynydd was around 50 minutes.
 Southbound
 three trains calling at all stations from Blaenau to Bala on Monday to Saturday
 two extra trains calling at all stations from Blaenau to Bala on Saturday
 an extra train calling at all stations from Blaenau to Trawsfynydd on Saturday evening
 a Monday to Friday train calling at all stations from Blaenau to Bala, except Llafar, Bryn-celynog and Cwm Prysor Halts
 The journey time from Blaenau to Trawsfynydd was around 30 minutes.
 There was no Sunday service.

After the Second World War at the latest most trains were composed of two carriages, with one regular turn comprising just one brake third coach. By that time such trains had become rare on Britain's railways. Workmen's trains had been a feature of the line from the outset; they were the Festiniog and Blaenau Railway's biggest source of revenue. Such a service between Trawsfynydd and Blaenau Ffestiniog survived to the line's closure to passengers in 1960. Up to 1930 at the earliest such services used dedicated, lower standard, coaches which used a specific siding at Blaenau where the men boarded from and alighted to the ballast.

The line from Bala north to Trawsfynydd was designated in the restrictive "Blue" weight limit, with the section from Trawsfynydd to Blaenau limited even more tightly to "Yellow". The literature conjectures on overweight classes being used on troop trains, but no solid claim or photograph has been published. Only two steam age photos of the line show anything other than an 0-4-2 or 0-6-0 tank engine, they being of GWR 2251 Class 0-6-0s taken in the 1940s. As the 1950s passed "5700" and "7400" 0-6-PTs stole the show, exemplified by 9610 at Festiniog in the 1950s. 0-4-2T engines "..suffer[ed] from limited tank capacity and power."

The station and the Army
The station was unusual in having separate platforms over 150 yards to the north for a nearby army camp. These are treated separately as Trawsfynydd Camp railway station. In 1907 an accident occurred involving a military train in which both drivers and two soldiers were injured.

Closure 
By the 1950s the line was deemed unremunerative. A survey undertaken in 1956 and 1957 found that the average daily numbers of passengers boarding and alighting were:

Blaenau Ffestiniog Central 62 and 65
Manod Halt 7 and 4
Teigl Halt 5 and 5
Festiniog 28 and 26
Maentwrog Road 8 and 6
Trawsfynydd Lake Halt 1 and 1
Trawsfynydd 28 and 24
Llafar Halt 2 and 2
Bryn-celynog Halt 2 and 2
Cwm Prysor Halt 3 and 3
Arenig 5 and 5
Capel Celyn Halt 7 and 8
Tyddyn Bridge Halt 4 and 6
Frongoch 18 and 15
Bala 65 and 58

Military traffic had ended and, apart from a finite contract to bring cement to Blaenau in connection with the construction of Ffestiniog Power Station freight traffic was not heavy, most arriving and leaving Bala did so from and to the south and that to Blaenau could be handled from the Conwy Valley Line northwards.

In 1957 Parliament authorised Liverpool Corporation to flood a section of the line by damming the Afon Tryweryn. Monies were made available to divert the route round the dam, but it was decided that improving the road from Bala to Llan Ffestiniog would be of greater benefit. Road transport alternatives were established for groups such as schoolchildren and workers. The plans afoot for rail serving Trawsfynydd nuclear power station were to be catered for by building the long-discussed cross-town link between the two Blaenau standard gauge stations. The estimated financial savings to be made were £23,300 by withdrawing the passenger service and £7000 in renewal charges.

The station closed to passengers in January 1960 and to rail freight a year later, though it remained open for freight carried by road until 4 May 1964. Tracks north of that halt sprung back to life in 1964 to serve Trawsfynydd nuclear power station.

A notable "last train" special ran from Bala to Blaenau Ffestiniog and return on 22 January 1961.

The station site in the 21st Century
By 2015 the station building was a private residence. The adjoining goods yard and military station site were in agricultural use. The engine shed was still standing in 1999, used as a store.

The future
Between 2000 and 2011 there were at least two attempts to put part of the remaining line to use, but neither of these aspired to reach Trawsfynydd. As the line of route to the south has been severed by Llyn Celyn the prospects of revival must be very remote.  In February 2012, there was a trial of a velorail (pedal powered train) on the line but this seems to have been short-lived.

Fresh moves to reopen the line from Blaenau as far south as Trawsfynydd began in September 2016, with the formation of The Trawsfynydd  Railway Company Ltd and its supporting society the Blaenau Ffestiniog and Trawsfynydd Railway Society. On 21 September at least one regional newspaper reported that "Volunteers are set to start work this weekend on clearing vegetation from the trackbed between Blaenau Ffestiniog and Trawsfynydd." The company was quoted as saying "We have been given a licence by Network Rail to clear and survey the line." Since then the group have established a presence in Blaenau Ffestiniog as they clear the section of line between Cwm Bowydd Road crossing and the station in Blaenau Ffestiniog. By mid-October 2016 the company had achieved six working days of track clearance. After the society's meeting on the 28th Jan 2017 they were given the go ahead to start on stage two of the project and to create a base to work from at Maentwrog Road. One week later On Saturday 4th Feb 2017 work started clearing the site at Maentwrog Road with Peter Cornes and his plant hire company from Crewe offering their time to clear the track with their fleet of mini diggers.

Gallery

References

Sources

Further material

External links
 The station site on a navigable OS Map National Library of Scotland
 The station on a navigable 1953 OS map npe Maps
 The station and line Rail Map Online
 The line LJT2 with mileages Railway Codes
 Remisinscences by a local railwayman Forgotten Relics
 Driver's view along the line to Blaenau YouTube
 The line in 2009 The Railway Muddler
 1960 Working timetable 2D53
 Details and photos of 22 Jan 1961 railtour Six Bells Junction
 The 1961 last train special YouTube
 An inspection saloon ride on the line, Part 1 YouTube
 An inspection saloon ride on the line, Part 2 YouTube
 Trawsfynydd tickets Michael Clemens Railways
 Signal box diagram Signalling Record Society
 The station about 1910 flickr
 The station in 1959 NW Rail
 A summary of the line with some unpublished photos Chasewater Railway
 Facebook page Trawsfynydd and Blaenau Ffestiniog Community Railway Company

Disused railway stations in Gwynedd
Trawsfynydd
Former Great Western Railway stations
Railway stations in Great Britain closed in 1960
Railway stations in Great Britain opened in 1882